The Vancouver Waldorf School is a private Waldorf school with preschool, kindergarten and grades 1 to 12. The main office and grade school are located at 2725 St Christophers Road in North Vancouver, British Columbia. It has a high school at a separate location in Edgemont Village. The curriculum includes an emphasis on experiential learning.

The school is a member of the Association of Waldorf Schools of North America.

See also
 Waldorf education
 Curriculum of the Waldorf schools

References

Elementary schools in British Columbia
High schools in British Columbia
Private schools in British Columbia
Waldorf schools in Canada
Educational institutions in Canada with year of establishment missing